Concha and Concho means "shell" in the Spanish and Portuguese languages. The word can also refer to:

Places
 Concho, Arizona, a frontier town now functioning as a retirement community in Apache County
 Concho, Oklahoma
 Concho County, Texas
 Concho, West Virginia
 Concho Valley, a region in West Texas
 Fort Concho, a National Historic Landmark in San Angelo, Texas

Rivers
 Concho River, a tributary of the Colorado River in Texas
 North Concho River, a tributary of the Concho River in Texas
 Middle Concho River, a tributary of the Concho River in Texas
 South Concho River, a tributary of the Concho River in Texas

Other
 Concho Resources Inc., a Texas oil exploration company
 Concha (bread), a sweet baked bread originally from México
 Concha or concho, a round decorative piece of metal seen on a western saddle and other horse equipment descended from the Spanish tradition
 The bowl-shaped part of the auricle (anatomy) (the external ear), nearest the ear canal
 Nasal concha (plural conchae) also known as turbinates
Concha, the word "shell" applied to a musical instrument made from an armadillo shell

See also
 Rio Conchos
De la Concha (disambiguation)